Dietmar is a German forename.

Dietmar I (archbishop of Salzburg), ruled 874 to 907
Dietmar von Aist, Minnesinger from a baronial family of Upper Austria, documented between 1140 and 1171
Dietmar Bär (born 1961), German actor
Dietmar Bartsch (born 1958), German politician, former Bundesgeschäftsführer
Dietmar Beiersdorfer (born 1963), former footballer and coach
Dietmar Berchtold (born 1974), Austrian football midfielder
Dietmar Bonnen (born 1958), German composer and pianist
Dietmar Bruck (born 1944), former professional footballer
Dietmar Burger (born 1968), Austrian darts player
Dietmar Constantini (born 1955), former Austrian association football player and now head coach
Dietmar Danner (born 1950), retired German footballer
Dietmar Dath (born 1970), German novelist
Dietmar Demuth (born 1955), German former footballer who is now manager
Dietmar Falkenberg, East German former bobsledder
Dietmar Feichtinger (born 1961), Austrian architect in Paris
Dietmar Hötger (born 1947), German judo athlete
Dietmar Haaf (born 1967), former (West) German long jumper
Dietmar Hamann (born 1973), German footballer
Dietmar Hirsch (born 1971), retired German football player
Dietmar Hopp (born 1940), German software entrepreneur
Dietmar Jerke, East German bobsledder
Dietmar Kühbauer (born 1971), former Austrian football midfielder
Dietmar Kirves (born 1941), multimedia artist
Dietmar Klinger (born 1958), retired German football player
Dietmar Koszewski (born 1967), retired German hurdler
Dietmar Lorenz (born 1950), East German judoka
Dietmar Mögenburg (born 1961), former (West) German high jumper and Olympic gold medallist
Dietmar Mürdter (born 1943), former professional German footballer
Dietmar Meinel, German Nordic combined skier
Dietmar Meisch (born 1959), retired East German race walker
Dietmar Rosenthal (1899–1994), Russian linguist
Dietmar Roth (born 1963), former German footballer
Dietmar Rothermund, Germany historian best known for his research in the economy of India
Dietmar Saupe (born 1954), fractal researcher and professor of computer science, University of Konstanz, Germany
Dietmar Schönherr (1926–2014), Austrian film actor
Dietmar Schacht (born 1962), former professional German footballer
Dietmar Schauerhammer (born 1955), East German two-time Winter Olympic champion
Dietmar Schiller, German rower
Dietmar Schlöglmann (born 1955), Austrian sprint canoeist
Dietmar Schmidt (born 1952), former East German handball player
Dietmar Schwager (born 1940), retired German football coach and player
Dietmar Schwarz (born 1947), German rower
Dietmar Seyferth (born 1929), German-American chemist, Professor Emeritus of MIT
Dietmar Vestweber (born 1956), biochemist & cell biologist, founding director of the Max-Planck-Institute for Molecular Biomedicine in Münster, Germany
Dietmar Wittmann, M.D., Ph.D., FACS is an academic surgeon specializing in complex abdominal surgery
Dietmar Wuttke (born 1978), German former footballer
Gert-Dietmar Klause (born 1945), a former East German cross-country skier

See also
Dietmar-Hopp-Stadion, a football ground in Sinsheim, Baden-Württemberg, Germany
Thietmar (disambiguation)

German masculine given names